Galina Komarova (born 12 August 1977) is a former Russian women's international footballer who played as a midfielder. She was a member of the Russia women's national football team. She was part of the team at the 1999 FIFA Women's World Cup and 2003 FIFA Women's World Cup.

References

1977 births
Living people
Russian women's footballers
Russia women's international footballers
Place of birth missing (living people)
1999 FIFA Women's World Cup players
2003 FIFA Women's World Cup players
Women's association football midfielders
FC Lada Togliatti (women) players
CSP Izmailovo players
Russian Women's Football Championship players